Monsieur Champagne was the first celebrity coiffeur for whom the term was first coined in France in 1663, shortly after his death.  His aristocratic clients included Princess Marie de Gonzague.  He was the title character in the comedy Champagne le coiffeur which was staged at the Théâtre du Marais.

See also
 Cosmetology

References

French hairdressers
17th-century deaths
17th-century French businesspeople